Seyyed Mohammad Hossein Behjat Tabrizi (January 2, 1906 – September 18, 1988), mainly known by his pen name, Shahriar, was a notable Iranian Azerbaijani poet who wrote in both Azerbaijani and Persian.
His most important work, Heydar Babaya Salam is considered to be the pinnacle in Azerbaijani literature which gained great popularity in the Turkic world and was translated to more than 30 languages.

Contrary to many other figures of his time, Shahriar barely involved himself with political problems and ideologies. He was, however, known for his avid nationalism; in his work, numerous metaphors commending Persepolis, Zoroaster and Ferdowsi are made.

Biography
Mohammad Hossein Shahriar was one of the first Azerbaijanis of Iran to write a significant collection of poetry in the Azerbaijani language. Born in 1906 in Tabriz, he received his elementary education, including the Divan of Hafez, under his father's supervision. Shahriar’s first formal education was at the Motahari (former Mansoor High School) Secondary School in Tabriz. He subsequently studied at the Dar-ol-Fonoun (former higher education school) in Tehran. Although he studied medicine in college, he dropped out just before getting his diploma and went to Khorasan, where he found a job as a notary public and bank clerk. He returned to Tehran in 1935 and started working in the Agricultural Bank of Iran. 

He also received an honorary Ph.D. degree from University of Tabriz in Literature.

He initially published his poems under his given name, Behjat, but later chose the name Shahriar. He published his first book of poems in 1929. His poems are mainly influenced by Hafez, a famous Persian poet, and Khasta Qasim, an old Azerbaijani poet.

His most famous work in Azerbaijani is Heydar Babaya Salam, published in 1954, which won immense popularity and has been translated into more than 30 languages and numerous plays all over the world.

Works
The poet began by composing tragic poetry. Many of his bittersweet memories are reflected in his books Hazyan-e Del, Heydar Baba, and Mumiyai. Heydar Baba, composed in Azeri and later translated into Persian, was for a long time on the top ten best-seller list in Tehran. Heydar Baba is the name of a mountain where the poet spent his childhood. He also wrote a book of epic poems, Takht-e Jamshid.

He was interested in humanistic issues and in his poem "A letter to Einstein" he criticized the result of his scientific work that was abused as the nuclear weapon.

Shahriar’s verse takes diverse forms, including lyrics, quatrains, couplets, odes, and elegies. One of his love poems, Hala Chera, was set to music by Rouhollah Khaleghi. The composition for orchestra and solo voice became one of his most well-known works. One of the major reasons for the success of Shahriar’s work is the sincerity of his words. Since he uses slang and colloquial language in the context of poetry, his poems are understandable and effective for a broad segment of the public.

Shahriar was a talented calligrapher, played the setar very well, and had a keen interest in music. He was a very close friend of the Persian musician and highly respected teacher, Abdulhossein Saba.

Death

His day of death is named the "national day of poem" in Iran.
A television series about his life, directed by Kamal Tabrizi, aired on IRIB channel 2.

He died on 18 September 1988 in one of the Tehran's hospitals and his body was transferred to Tabriz and was buried in Maqbaratoshoara (Tombs of Poets).

References

Further reading

External links 

Patriotic Poems by Shahriar
Photos from the museum of Iran's famous poet Shahriar

Azerbaijani-language poets
Exophonic writers
20th-century Iranian poets
People from Tabriz
1906 births
1988 deaths
University of Tabriz alumni
20th-century Iranian people
Burials in Maqbaratoshoara